Zdeněk Majstr (born 11 February 1948) was a speedway rider from the Czech Republic.

Speedway career
Majstr partnered Jan Holub I to the World Pairs final at the 1969 Speedway World Pairs Championship. He was also part of the Czechoslovakian team that reached the final of the 1970 Speedway World Team Cup.

World Final appearances

World Pairs Championship
 1969 -  Stockholm (with Jan Holub I) - 5th - 12pts (4)

World Team Cup
 1970 -  London, Wembley Stadium (with Jan Holub I / Jiří Štancl / Miloslav Verner / Václav Verner) - 4th

World Longtrack Championship
 1973 -  Oslo (13th) 3pts

References

1948 births
Living people
Czech speedway riders